= Avdifaks =

Avdifaks (Russian: Авдифа́кс or Авди́факс) is a Russian Christian male first name. It is possibly derived from the Latin words audio, meaning to listen, and fax, meaning light.
